Mahendra Mahila College is a degree college in Gopalganj, Bihar, India. It is a constituent unit of Jai Prakash University. The college offers intermediate and three years degree course (TDC) in arts.

History 
The college was established in the year 1972.

Departments 

 Arts
 Hindi
  English
 Sanskrit
 Philosophy
 Economics
 Political Science
 History
 Psychology
 Home Science

References

External links 

 Jai Prakash University website

Constituent colleges of Jai Prakash University
Educational institutions established in 1972
1972 establishments in Bihar
Gopalganj district, India